Ondrej Glajza (born ) is a Slovak cyclo-cross cyclist. He competed in the men's under-23 event at the 2016 UCI Cyclo-cross World Championships in Heusden-Zolder.

Major results

Cyclo-cross

2010–2011
 1st  National Junior Championships
2011–2012
 1st  National Junior Championships
2014–2015
 2nd National Championships
 2nd International Cyclocross Marikovská Dolina
2015–2016
 1st Tage des Querfeldeinsports (Day of Cyclocross)
 2nd National Championships
 2nd Cyclo-cross International Podbrezova
2016–2017
 3rd National Championships
2017–2018
 2nd Tage des Querfeldeinsports (Day of Cyclocross)
 2nd GP Kosice
 2nd GP Poprad
2018–2019
 1st  National Championships
 2nd Grand Prix Topoľčianky
 2nd Grand Prix Kosice
 2nd Grand Prix Podbrezová
 3rd Grand Prix Trnava
2020–2021
 3rd National Championships
 3rd Grand Prix Podbrezova

MTB
2012
 1st  National Junior XCO Championships
2015
 3rd National XCE Championships
2016
 1st  National XCO Championships
 2nd National XCE Championships

References

External links
 

1994 births
Living people
Cyclo-cross cyclists
Slovak male cyclists
Place of birth missing (living people)
Sportspeople from Bratislava